The 2020 Emperor's Cup was the 100th edition of the annual Japanese national football cup tournament. The tournament, originally scheduled to begin on 23 May, was rescheduled to begin on 16 September and ended with the final on 1 January 2021 at the National Stadium.

The number of teams was reduced to 50 as a result of the COVID-19 pandemic in Japan, and subsequently changed to 52 teams. Both the champions of the 2020 J2 League and the 2020 J3 League entered at the quarter-finals. The top two teams from the 2020 J1 League entered at the semi-finals.

The defending champions were Vissel Kobe but they were unable to defend the title as they failed to qualify through the top two of the 2020 J1 League.

The J1 League champions Kawasaki Frontale completed the double by beating the league's runners-up Gamba Osaka in the final, earning their first Emperor's Cup title.

Calendar
The revised schedule was announced on 18 June 2020.

Regional allocation
JFA decided that 48 amateur teams would be split into 8 regions, and each region would be represented by 1 team in the Fourth Round. 8 regions were based on 9 regional football associations in Japan (Hokkaido & Tohoku would be merged into a single region).

 Kantō (all 8 prefectural representative teams participate from First Round);
 Kyushu (all 8 prefectural representative teams participate from First Round);
 Hokushinetsu (5 prefectural representative teams, with 3 teams participate from Second Round and 2 teams participate from First Round);
 Tōkai (4 prefectural representative teams plus Honda FC, with 3 teams participate from Second Round and 2 teams participate from First Round);
 Chūgoku (5 prefectural representative teams, with 3 teams participate from Second Round and 2 teams participate from First Round);
 Hokkaido & Tohoku (7 prefectural representative teams, with 1 team participate from Second Round and 6 teams participate from First Round);
 Shikoku (all 4 prefectural representative teams participate from Second Round);
 Kansai (6 prefectural representative teams, with 2 teams participate from Second Round and 4 teams participate from First Round);

Participating clubs
52 clubs will compete in the tournament.

Bracket 
Source:Tournament table (Official website in Japanese)

Hokkaido & Tohoku Regions

Kantō Region

Hokushinetsu Region

Tōkai Region

Kansai Region

Chūgoku Region

Shikoku Region

Kyushu Region

Fourth & Fifth Round

Finals

First round 
The draw for the first through third rounds was conducted on 29 July 2020.

Hokkaido & Tohoku Regions

Kantō Region

Hokushinetsu Region

Tōkai Region

Kansai Region

Chūgoku Region

Kyushu Region

Second round
Source:Fixtures/Results (Official website in Japanese）

Hokkaido & Tohoku Regions

Kantō Region

Hokushinetsu Region

Tōkai Region

Kansai Region

Chūgoku Region

Shikoku Region

Kyushu Region

Third round

Hokkaido & Tohoku Regions

Kantō Region

Hokushinetsu Region

Tōkai Region

Kansai Region

Chūgoku Region

Shikoku Region

Kyushu Region

Fourth round

Fifth round
Venues for the fifth round through the semi-finals were announced on 10 December, depending on the teams advanced to the respective matches.

Quarter-finals

Semi-finals

Final

See also
 Japan Football Association (JFA)

 J.League
 2020 J1 League (I)
 2020 J2 League (II)
 2020 J3 League (III)
 2020 Japan Football League (IV)
 2020 Japanese Regional Leagues (V/VI)

 2020 Fuji Xerox Super Cup (Super Cup)
 2020 Emperor's Cup (National Cup)
 2020 J.League YBC Levain Cup (League Cup)

References

External links
2020 Emperor's Cup – official website at JLeague.jp 

Emperor's Cup
Emperor's Cup
Cup
2021 in Japanese football
Emperor's Cup